III Anti-Aircraft Corps was a high-level formation of Britain's Anti-Aircraft Command from 1940 to 1942. It defended Scotland, Northern Ireland and North East England during the Blitz and the middle years of the Second World War.

Origin
AA Command had been created in 1938 to control the Territorial Army's rapidly-expanding anti-aircraft (AA) organisation within Air Defence of Great Britain. On the outbreak of war in September 1939, it commanded seven AA Divisions, each with several AA Brigades, disposed around the United Kingdom. Continued expansion made this organisation unwieldy, so in November 1940 – during the Luftwaffe'''s nightly Blitz on London and other British cities – five further AA Divisions were organised, and all the divisions grouped under three corps headquarters directly subordinate to AA Command. III AA Corps covered North Eastern England, Scotland and Northern Ireland, and by February 1941 comprised four division-level headquarters and 11 brigades. Its boundaries roughly coincided with No. 13 Group and No. 14 Group of RAF Fighter Command.Frederick, p. 1047.

Order of battle
III AA Corps had the following organisation from February 1941:Farndale,  Annex D, pp. 257–9.Order of Battle of Non-Field Force Units in the United Kingdom, Part 27: AA Command, 12 May 1941, The National Archives (TNA), Kew file WO 212/79.Order of Battle of Non-Field Force Units in the United Kingdom, Part 27: AA Command, 14 May 1942, with amendments, TNA file WO 212/81.

Corps HQ: Edinburgh

General Officer Commanding:Farndale, Annex J.
 Lieutenant-General H. G. Martin 

3rd AA Division
 36th (Scottish) Anti-Aircraft Brigade (Edinburgh, Forth)
 51st Light Anti-Aircraft Brigade (North East Scotland)
 52nd Light Anti-Aircraft Brigade (Sectors)

7th AA Division
 30th (Northumbrian) Anti-Aircraft Brigade (Tyne)
 43rd Anti-Aircraft Brigade (Tees, Middlesbrough)
 57th Light Anti-Aircraft Brigade (North East England sector layout)

12th AA Division
 3rd Anti-Aircraft Brigade (Northern Ireland)
 42nd Anti-Aircraft Brigade (Clyde, Glasgow)
 63rd Anti-Aircraft Brigade (West of Scotland Gun Defence Areas, sectors)

Orkney & Shetland Defence Force (OSDEF)
 58th Anti-Aircraft Brigade
 59th Anti-Aircraft Brigade

Intermediate Ammunition Depots
 Kincardine
 Finchale, County Durham

Equipment Ammunition Magazines
 Invergordon
 Bishopbriggs, near Glasgow
 Renfrew, near Glasgow

Operations
During its short existence, III AA Corps had to deal with the 1940–41 Blitz on industrial towns and cities such as Belfast, Clydebank, Greenock and Newcastle upon Tyne, as well as later raids on Middlesbrough and Sunderland. In August 1942, the 3rd AA Division HQ was sent south to assist in defending the South Coast of England against 'hit and run' attacks by the Luftwaffe.Routledge, pp. 402–3.

Disbandment
The AA Corps and Divisional HQs were disbanded in October 1942 and a replaced by a more flexible system of AA Groups. The area covered by III AA Corps became the responsibility of two of the new groups: 6th Anti-Aircraft Group (North East England and Scotland) and 7th Anti-Aircraft Group (Northern Ireland); OSDEF remained directly subordinate to AA Command.Routledge, p. 401 & Map 36.

Notes

References

 Gen Sir Martin Farndale, History of the Royal Regiment of Artillery: The Years of Defeat: Europe and North Africa, 1939–1941, Woolwich: Royal Artillery Institution, 1988/London: Brasseys, 1996, .
 J.B.M. Frederick, Lineage Book of British Land Forces 1660–1978, Vol II, Wakefield, Microform Academic, 1984, .
 Brig N.W. Routledge, History of the Royal Regiment of Artillery: Anti-Aircraft Artillery 1914–55'', London: Royal Artillery Institution/Brassey's, 1994, 
 Sir Frederick Pile's despatch: 'The Anti-Aircraft Defence of the United Kingdom from 28 July 1939, to 15 April 1945' London Gazette 18 December 1947

External sources
 British Military History
 Generals of World War II

Corps of the British Army in World War II
Air defence units and formations of the British Army
Military units and formations in Edinburgh
Military units and formations established in 1940
Military units and formations disestablished in 1942